The International Federation of Philosophical Societies (French: Fédération Internationale des Sociétés de Philosophie, FISP) is a world organization for learned societies in philosophy. Its member-societies arguably include every country where there is significant academic work in this field. Members also include philosophical institutions at regional and international levels.

FISP is the highest non-governmental world organization for philosophy. It sponsors the International Philosophy Olympiad and (every five years) the World Congress of Philosophy. The 24th World Congress of Philosophy was held in Beijing, China, in August 2018. Previous World Congresses of Philosophy were held in Athens (2013), Seoul (2008), Istanbul (2003), and other cities in several countries. FISP is governed by an international board and steering committee, and its officers include prominent philosophers from various member countries. The current president is Luca Scarantino and the general secretary is Suwanna Satha-Anand. Past presidents include Dermot Moran, William L.McBride, Peter Kemp, Ioanna Kuçuradi, Evandro Agazzi, and Francisco Miró Quesada.

History 
FISP was established in August 1948 at the 10th International Congress of Philosophy in Amsterdam. The first president of FISP was the Dutch philosopher H. J. Pos, who had also been president of the Amsterdam congress. The first secretary general was Raymond Bayer, who had been Secrétaire général of the IXe Congrès International de Philosophie in Paris in 1937. FISP was established to contribute "to the development of professional relations between philosophers of all countries, freely and with mutual respect" and the organization remains committed to this goal.

Since the dawn of human civilization, philosophy and the humanities serve to enhance the understanding of goodness and truth, supporting the foundations for peace and the common good.

References

External links 
 
 The International Council for Philosophy and Human Sciences

Organizations established in 1948
Philosophical societies
International learned societies